Osaka Pro Wrestling is a Japanese professional wrestling promotion, founded in 1998 by Super Delfin. The promotion held a major flagship event called the Osaka Hurricane each year from 2003 to 2012 and also hosted the fourth edition of the Super J-Cup in 2004, which was the second edition of Osaka Hurricane. In 2010 Osaka Pro started a close working relationship with American promotion Chikara.

On March 1, 2014, Osaka Pro announced that it would fold on April 20, 2014, due to financial difficulties, after which all of its wrestlers would become freelancers. Osaka Pro later announced that the promotion would continue under new president Yuji Sakagami and wrestlers Kuishinbo Kamen and Takoyakida. The new Osaka Pro Wrestling lost many of the old one's key wrestlers as well as their home base of Nasci Hall Umeda, forcing them to employ a new tour format.

In October 2021, it was announced that Zeus had been appointed as the owner and president of OPW. He became president on July 30, and on August 26, he received a share transfer from former owner Yuji Sakagami. However, he remained under contract with All Japan Pro Wrestling (AJPW) for the rest of the year.

Roster

Notable alumni

 Apple Miyuki (RDPW)
 Atsushi Kotoge (Noah)
 Azumi Hyuga (JWP Joshi Puroresu)
 Daigoro Kashiwa (Kaientai Dojo)
 Daisuke Harada (Noah)
 Gamma (D-Gate)
 Gami (Wave Pro)
 Hayata (Noah)
 Kaito Ishida (D-Gate)
 Kanjyuro Matsuyama
 Kuuga
 Magnitude Kishiwada (Freelancer)
 Masamune (DES)
 Orochi (DES)
 Rising Hayato (AJPW)
 Sawako Shimono (Freelancer)
 Super Delfin (Okinawa Pro Wrestling)
 Tadasuke
 Thunder
 Yuu Yamagata

Staff
Keigo Yoshino (Referee)
Naoki (Ring announcer)
Shinjiro Miyao (Ring announcer)
Zeus (President & Owner)

Championships

Active

Inactive

Annual tournaments

Major events
Osaka Hurricane

See also
Professional wrestling in Japan
List of professional wrestling promotions in Japan

References

External links
Official site

 
Sport in Osaka
Companies based in Osaka Prefecture
1998 establishments in Japan